The William H. Waterhouse House is a historic residence in Maitland, Florida, United States, that is listed on the National Register of Historic Places.

Description

The home is a 2½ story L-shaped structure located at 820 South Lake Lily Drive, and was originally built in 1884 by carpenter William Waterhouse. Additions to the house were completed in about 1908, 1910, 1930, and the 1950s. It is one of only a few remaining examples of nineteenth century vernacular architecture in Maitland.

The Maitland Historical Society owns the house and operates it as a Victorian era historic house museum known as the Waterhouse Residence Museum.  The adjacent 1883 Carpentry Shop Museum features a display of 19th and early 20th century woodworking tools.

The house was added to the National Register of Historic Places February 2, 1983.

See also

 National Register of Historic Places listings in Orange County, Florida

References

External links

 Art & History Museums - Maitland - official site
 Orange County listings
 Orange County listings at Florida's Office of Cultural and Historical Programs

Historic house museums in Florida
Museums in Orange County, Florida
Historical society museums in Florida
Houses on the National Register of Historic Places in Florida
National Register of Historic Places in Orange County, Florida
Houses in Orange County, Florida
Maitland, Florida
1884 establishments in Florida
Houses completed in 1884